The name Mick has been used for two tropical cyclone in the South Pacific after replacing Mark after 1982-83:
Cyclone Mick (1993) – Weak tropical cyclone that passed through Fiji, Tonga and New Zealand. 
Cyclone Mick (2009) – Made landfall on Fiji and killed at least eight.

South Pacific cyclone set index articles